Gilbert Balibaseka Bukenya is a Ugandan politician and physician who was the seventh vice president of Uganda from 23 May 2003 until 23 May 2011. He has represented the constituency of Busiro County North in the Ugandan Parliament since 1996. His autobiography, Intricate Corridors to Power, was published in 2008.

Background

Education
He was educated by the Brothers of Christian Instruction order in Uganda. He had his early education at St. Savio Primary School, Kisubi, St. Mary's College Kisubi, St. Edward Secondary School, Bukuumi and Old Kampala Secondary School.

Later, he joined Makerere University School of Medicine in 1971, graduating in 1976 with the Bachelor of Medicine and Bachelor of Surgery (MBChB). He worked as a Medical Officer at Mbale Hospital up to 1982 when he left Uganda for Papua New Guinea.

While outside Uganda, he obtained a Diploma in Public Health from the Royal Institute of Public Health, in London, in 1982. He also attained the degrees of Master of Science (MSc) from the London School of Hygiene and Tropical Medicine UK, and Doctor of Philosophy (PhD) from the University of Queensland, with a thesis topic of The Epidemiology of Under-Five Childhood Diarrhoeas in a Peri-Urban Population of Papua New Guinea.

Work experience
Gilbert Bukenya returned to Uganda as a Professor of Medicine and was appointed dean of Makerere University School of Medicine, a position he held from 1994 until 1996. In 1996 he entered politics and was elected Member of Parliament (MP) for Busiro North constituency. He also served as chairman of the National Resistance Movement (NRM) parliamentary caucus. During this period he is credited for having managed to defuse the tension that was boiling up between President Yoweri Museveni and other historical leaders of the ruling NRM. He was chairman of the NRM in the Buganda region. Bukenya subsequently became Minister of State for Trade and Industry before being elevated to the post of Minister of the Presidency. He became Vice President in 2003 replacing Specioza Kazibwe, who at the time was grappling with a failed marriage. He later stood for the post of Secretary General of the NRM and lost to Amama Mbabazi. In May 2011, he was replaced as Vice President of Uganda by Edward Ssekandi.

Personal details
He is married to Dr. Margaret Bukenya, a classmate at Makerere Medical School in the early 1970s. He is a member of the Catholic Church. In 2005 Dr. Bukenya surprised political watchers when he alleged that the government was being controlled by a mafia clique. In an interview with the Daily Monitor, he said that the mafia was plotting his downfall. This was attributed to his ever-increasing popularity and his closeness to the powerful Catholic Church in Uganda. He is reported to enjoy swimming and farming. He is credited with the introduction of the cultivation of upland rice, also known as NERICA in Uganda.

Published works

See also

References

External links
 Website of the Parliament of Uganda
 Gilbert Bukenya Has Announced his Retirement From Politics

1949 births
Living people
Ganda people
People from Wakiso District
Vice presidents of Uganda
Members of the Parliament of Uganda
Makerere University alumni
Ugandan public health doctors
National Resistance Movement politicians
Academic staff of Makerere University
Ugandan Roman Catholics
People educated at St. Mary's College Kisubi
Fellows of Uganda National Academy of Sciences
21st-century Ugandan politicians